En La Fusa con Maria Creuza y Toquinho is a 1970 live album by Maria Creuza and Toquinho in partnership with Vinicius de Moraes.  It was recorded at the La Fusa Bar in Buenos Aires.

Track listing

 Copa do mundo (Maugeri, Müller, Sobrinho e Dagô) - 01:12
 A felicidade (Vinicius de Moraes / Antonio Carlos Jobim) - 03:27
 Tomara (Vinicius de Moraes) - 04:17
 Que maravilha (Jorge Ben / Toquinho)- 02:28
 Lamento no morro (Vinicius de Moraes / Antonio Carlos Jobim) - 02:24
 Berimbau / Consolação (Vinicius de Moraes / Baden Powell) - 02:46
 Irene (Caetano Veloso) - 02:33
 Canto de Ossanha (Vinicius de Moraes / Baden Powell) - 03:05
 Garota de Ipanema (Vinicius de Moraes / Antonio Carlos Jobim) - 02:23
 Samba em prelúdio (Vinicius de Moraes / Baden Powell) - 03:49
 Catendé (Antônio Carlos e Jocafi / Ildásio Tavares) - 05:10
 Valsa da Tunisia (Vinicius de Moraes) - 03:08
 Eu sei que vou te amar (canção)|Eu sei que vou te amar (Vinicius de Moraes / Antonio Carlos Jobim) - 03:28
 Minha namorada (Vinicius de Moraes / Carlos Lyra) - 03:57
 Se todos fossem iguais a você (Vinicius de Moraes / Antonio Carlos Jobim)- 02:57

Personnel

Vinícius de Moraes - lyrics
Maria Creuza – vocals
Toquinho – arrangements, vocals, guitar
Enrique Roizner - drums

References  

Toquinho albums
Vinicius de Moraes albums
1970 live albums
Live albums recorded in Buenos Aires